Antonio Fenelus (born January 15, 1990) is an American football coach and former defensive back who is currently the defensive backs coach at the University of Illinois. He began his professional career with the Indianapolis Colts of the National Football League (NFL), and played his college football for the Wisconsin Badgers.

Playing career

Fenelus played his college football at Wisconsin under Bret Bielema being awarded first team all Big Ten twice. In 2012 he was signed as an undrafted free agent with the Indianapolis Colts but he never made the final roster. After playing out 2012 with the Omaha Night Hawks, he then had a season in the Canadian Football League with the Saskatchewan Roughriders in 2013. In 2014 he played with the Arizona Rattlers of the Arena Football League where he won the Arena Bowl.

Coaching career

Early coaching career
Fenelus began his coaching career in 2015 at his alma mater working as a graduate assistant. He stayed in that position until 2017. In 2018 he served as the defensive coordinator and defensive backs coach at East Central University in Division II. In 2021 and 2022 he worked as a defensive analyst in the SEC at LSU.

Illinois
On December 30, 2022 he joined his former coach Bret Bielema at Illinois as the team’s defensive backs coach.

References

1990 births
Living people
American football defensive backs
Sportspeople from Boca Raton, Florida
Illinois Fighting Illini football coaches
Indianapolis Colts players
Omaha Nighthawks players
Saskatchewan Roughriders players
Arizona Rattlers players
Wisconsin Badgers football coaches
East Central Tigers football coaches
LSU Tigers football coaches